2001 in television may refer to:

2001 in American television
2001 in Australian television
2001 in Belgian television
2001 in Brazilian television
2001 in British television
2001 in Canadian television
2001 in Croatian television
2001 in Danish television
2001 in Dutch television
2001 in Estonian television
2001 in French television
2001 in German television
2001 in Irish television
2001 in Israeli television
2001 in Italian television
2001 in Japanese television
2001 in New Zealand television
2001 in Norwegian television
2001 in Philippine television
2001 in Polish television
2001 in Portuguese television
2001 in Scottish television
2001 in South African television
2001 in Spanish television
2001 in Swedish television
2001 in Thai television